Seyfert Mill is a historic grist mill located in Upper Tulpehocken Township, Berks County, Pennsylvania.  The combined mill and house building was built in 1840, and is a 2 1/2-story, with basement, banked stone building. It measures . Also on the property are the contributing millrace and pond. The mill ceased operation in about 1954.

It was listed on the National Register of Historic Places in 1990.

Gallery

References

Grinding mills in Berks County, Pennsylvania
Grinding mills on the National Register of Historic Places in Pennsylvania
Industrial buildings completed in 1840
Houses completed in 1840
Houses in Berks County, Pennsylvania
National Register of Historic Places in Berks County, Pennsylvania